Picene may refer to:

 picene, a hydrocarbon
 Picene, a modern ethnonym for a resident of ancient Picenum in Italy, also found in the plural as Picentes or Picentini; thus:
 either of two extinct languages speculated to have possibly been spoken by Picenes:
 North Picene language
South Picene language

See also

Piceno (disambiguation)